Saravakota is a village in Srikakulam district of the Indian state of Andhra Pradesh. It is located in Saravakota mandal of Palakonda revenue division.

Geography
It has an average elevation of 61 meters (203 feet). It is a part of Narasannapeta Legislative Assembly Constituency.

Transportation 

Saravakota is Well Connected by APSRTC buses and private Buses.

Autos , taxis are available to this village. Major Road National Highway 326A (India) passes through this village. Nearest  towns are Pathapatnam , Narasannapeta , Challavanipeta , Tekkali.

Nearest Railway Station are Pathapatnam Railway station , Tilaru railway station.

APSRTC runs Several buses from Visakhapatnam Srikakulam to Pathapatnam town.

References 

Villages in Srikakulam district
Mandal headquarters in Srikakulam district